Mesob (Amharic: መሶብ) is a basket used for storing injera, an Ethiopian and Eritrean flatbread. It is widely depicted as a cultural symbol for Ethiopia and Eritrea made from locally grown and partially dyed grass and palm leaves known for strength and durability.

In popular culture
Mesob is depicted in 10 birr note as a woman hold to sew it. Mesob is used for death ceremony to support family of the deceased person and widely viewed as a symbolical representation of Ethiopian and Eritrean culture and their cuisine.

References

Ethiopian culture
Eritrean culture
Ethiopian cuisine
Eritrean cuisine
Kitchenware